Charles Orson Burney Jr. (May 28, 1907 – October 1972) was an American lawyer and politician from New York.

Life
He was born on May 28, 1907, in Buffalo, New York, the son of Charles O. Burney. He attended the University of Buffalo.

In May 1935, he married Helen B. Clode. He was Village Attorney of Williamsville.

Burney Jr was a member of the New York State Assembly (Erie Co., 7th D..) in 1937, 1938 and 1939–1940.

He was a member of the New York State Senate from 1941 to 1948, sitting in the 163rd, 164th, 165th and 166th New York State Legislatures. He was a delegate to the 1944 Republican National Convention. In 1948, he ran for re-election, but was defeated by Democrat Benjamin Miller.

Burney died in October 1972.

Sources

1907 births
1972 deaths
Lawyers from Buffalo, New York
Republican Party New York (state) state senators
Republican Party members of the New York State Assembly
University at Buffalo alumni
20th-century American politicians
Politicians from Buffalo, New York
20th-century American lawyers